A bullfinch is a bird belonging to one of two groups of passerine birds

Bullfinch can also refer to:

 Bullfinch (obstacle), an obstacle seen on the cross-country course in the sport of eventing
 USS Bullfinch, the name of two US Navy ships
 Bullfinch, Western Australia, a town in Australia

See also
 Bulfinch (disambiguation)